The Formula Regional Japanese Championship is a Japan ese formula racing championship held under FIA Formula Regional car regulations. Announced by the Japan Automobile Federation on 26 December 2019, it was confirmed that K2 Planet, promoter of Super Taikyu Series, would organise the championship starting in the 2020 season. The top nine finishing drivers in the championship receive FIA Super License points.

Car
The championship utilizes a spec chassis for all competitors, this being the DOME F111/3 chassis. The car will be powered by a single-make 270hp turbo engine provided by Autotecnica. 

Specifications
Engine: In-line 4-cylinder 1750cc intercooler turbo MAX 270hp
Gearbox: 6-speed paddle shift + mechanical LSD
Weight: 670kg (minimum weight including driver and ballast)
Length ': 4,900mm 
Width :  1,850mm
Wheelbase : 2,950mm
Steering: rack and pinion

Champions

Drivers

Teams

Masters Cup

Circuits 

 Bold denotes a circuit used in the 2022 season.

Notes

References

External links

See also
 Super Formula Lights (Japanese regional F2000/F3-class; had been F3 until promoters changed to Euroformula Open format)
 Super Formula (Japanese regional F3000/F2-class)

Formula Regional Japanese Championship
Auto racing series in Japan
Recurring sporting events established in 2020
2020 establishments in Japan